Weeki Wachee High School is a Hernando County, Florida public school in Weeki Wachee, Florida. The school's teams compete as the Hornets. The school is located at 12150 Vespa Way.

References 

Educational institutions in the United States with year of establishment missing
High schools in Hernando County, Florida
Public high schools in Florida